Hans ten Houten (14 April 1916 – 10 December 1988) was a Dutch rower. He competed in the men's single sculls event at the 1936 Summer Olympics.

References

1916 births
1988 deaths
Dutch male rowers
Olympic rowers of the Netherlands
Rowers at the 1936 Summer Olympics
Rowers from Amsterdam
20th-century Dutch people